Robert Murphy (8 July 1876 – 27 May 1966) was an Australian politician.

He was born in Scottsdale. In 1931 he was elected to the Tasmanian House of Assembly as a Nationalist member for Bass. He held the seat until his defeat in 1934. He died in Launceston.

References

1876 births
1966 deaths
Nationalist Party of Australia members of the Parliament of Tasmania
Members of the Tasmanian House of Assembly